Svetlana Igorevna Mironova (born 22 February 1994) is a Russian biathlete.

Career
Mironova was engaged in cross-country skiing until 2011, when she decided to switch competing in biathlon.

At the 2013 Junior World Championships in Obertilliach, she became the relay champion alongside  teammates Victoria Slivko and Uliana Kaisheva. In the same championship, she won bronze in the sprint, was 11th in the pursuit and 24th in the individual race. In 2014, at the U21 European Championships, she took second place in the sprint and became the champion in the pursuit.

Mironova made her World Cup debut in the 2016-17 season in Pyeongchang, finishing 64th in the sprint held on 2 March 2017.

In the 2017-18 season, Mironova took part in seven out of nine stages. Her best result was 9th in the Hochfilzen sprint. By the end of the season, she was named rookie of the year by the International Biathlon Union.

Svetlana competed in the 2019 Biathlon World Championships in Östersund, finishing 31st in the sprint, 25th in the pursuit and 33rd in the individual race.

Mironova made to her first World Cup podium at 13 December 2019 in the sprint race in Hochfilzen. She also finished 2nd at the same stage in the women's relay.

On 10 January 2021, Mironova played an instrumental part in the Russian mixed relay gold medal (alongside Uliana Kaisheva, Alexander Loginov and Eduard Latypov) at the World Cup in Oberhof, ending the anti-record 43-race podiumless streak for the Russian biathletes.

Biathlon results
All results are sourced from the International Biathlon Union.

Olympic Games
1 medal (1 silver)

World Championships

Junior/Youth World Championships
2 medals (1 gold, 1 bronze)

References

External links

Profile on biathlonworld.com

Russian female biathletes
Living people
1994 births
Sportspeople from Tomsk Oblast
Biathletes at the 2022 Winter Olympics
Medalists at the 2022 Winter Olympics
Olympic biathletes of Russia
Olympic medalists in biathlon
Olympic silver medalists for the Russian Olympic Committee athletes